Jalan Kuala Sungai Baru-Sungai Udang (Melaka state route M143) is a major road in Malacca, Malaysia.

List of junctions 

Roads in Malacca